Washington Emilio MacEachen Vásquez (born 4 May 1992) is a professional footballer who plays as a centre-back for Santamarina.

Life and career 

Emilio came through the youth system at Uruguay’s most successful club, C.A. Peñarol, and was promoted to the first team in the 2010-11 Primera División season, for which he was assigned squad number 2. He made seven appearances in this season, one of which was as a substitute. His debut came in a 2-0 win against Cerro on 13 March 2011.

Emilio was also a squad member for Peñarol’s 2011 Copa Libertadores campaign, in which the club reached the final. He was an unused substitute in six 2011 Libertadores matches, including the first leg of the final against Santos of Brazil.

On 1 February 2017, Necaxa announced that MacEachen would be joining the club on loan for 6 months with an option to sign permanently. He made his debut on February 15 in a Copa MX group-stage match against Chiapas Jaguar.

Career statistics

References

External links 
 Official Peñarol website (Spanish)
 
 

1992 births
Living people
Uruguayan footballers
Uruguayan expatriate footballers
Uruguayan people of Scottish descent
People from Artigas Department
Association football defenders
Peñarol players
Parma Calcio 1913 players
Sud América players
Club Necaxa footballers
Atlético San Luis footballers
Alebrijes de Oaxaca players
Atlante F.C. footballers
Cerro Largo F.C. players
Rampla Juniors players
Club y Biblioteca Ramón Santamarina footballers
Uruguayan Primera División players
Serie A players
Liga MX players
Ascenso MX players
Expatriate footballers in Italy
Expatriate footballers in Mexico
Uruguayan expatriate sportspeople in Italy
Uruguayan expatriate sportspeople in Mexico